Hilliard Gates Sports Center is a multi-purpose arena located in the northeast corner of the Purdue University Fort Wayne campus, in Fort Wayne, Indiana. It opened in 1981 and contains  of space. It is home to the Purdue Fort Wayne Mastodons volleyball and men's and women's basketball teams.

The venue is named for former area sportscaster Hilliard Gates. Before being renamed in his honor in 1991, the Gates Center was known as the Multipurpose Building.

The center was damaged by two burst pipes in 2019, which released 20,000 to 40,000 gallons of water, forcing the cancellation of an indoor track meet.

In addition to its use as a venue for intercollegiate competition, the Gates Center also has fitness facilities for students and faculty. Alumni and members of the general public may also use these facilities by purchasing a pass.

See also
 List of NCAA Division I basketball arenas

References

External links
 Official Website

Sports venues in Indiana
College basketball venues in the United States
Indoor arenas in Indiana
Sports venues in Fort Wayne, Indiana
Purdue Fort Wayne Mastodons men's basketball
1981 establishments in Indiana
Sports venues completed in 1981